Sakoinsé is a town in the Kokologho Department of Boulkiemdé Province in central western Burkina Faso. It has a population of 6,686. The local park is home to the town's skateboarding scene, and features several large half-pipes.

References

External links
Satellite map at Maplandia.com

Populated places in Boulkiemdé Province